Albéric Collin (6 April 1886 – 27 February 1962) was a Belgian animalier sculptor. In 1920 he won a gold medal in the art competitions of the Olympic Games for his "La Force" ("Strength").

References

Further reading
 René Édouard-Joseph, Dictionnaire biographique des artistes contemporains, tome 1, A-E, Art & Édition, 1930, p. 308
 L'orientalisme et l'africanisme dans l'art belge . 19e et 20e siècle, exhibition catalogue, Brussels, Galerie CGER, 14 September - 11 November 1984

External links
 Delarge: COLLIN, Albéric 
 Alberic Collin, Mapping the Practice and Profession of Sculpture in Britain and Ireland 1851-1951, University of Glasgow History of Art and HATII, online database 2011, accessed 24 Dec 2021
 OxfordArtOnline.com - Benezit (subscription required)
 Databaseolympics.com

1886 births
1962 deaths
Olympic gold medalists in art competitions
20th-century Belgian sculptors
Medalists at the 1920 Summer Olympics
Olympic competitors in art competitions
Art competitors at the 1920 Summer Olympics